Air Vice Marshal Cuthbert Trelawder MacLean,  (18 October 1886 – 25 February 1969) was a Royal Air Force officer who served as Air Officer Commanding-in-Chief at Middle East Command from 1934 to 1938.

RAF career
Educated at Wanganui Collegiate School and Auckland University College in New Zealand, MacLean served in the First World War in the 7th Royal Fusiliers and was seconded to the Royal Flying Corps in 1915. He was awarded his aviator's certificate in October 1915 and successively served as a flight, squadron, wing and brigade commander. He received the Distinguished Service Order for distinguished service in France.

He went on to be Air Officer Commanding British Forces Aden in 1929 and Director of Postings at the Air Ministry in 1931 before becoming Air Officer Commanding Middle East Command in 1934. He was appointed Air Officer Commanding No. 2 (Bomber) Group in 1938 and served in that role in the early stages of the Second World War before retiring in 1940.

He was awarded the rank of Chevalier in the Légion d'honneur.

References

|-

|-

|-

|-

1886 births
1969 deaths
British Army personnel of World War I
New Zealand military personnel
Royal Fusiliers soldiers
Royal Flying Corps officers
People educated at Whanganui Collegiate School
University of Auckland alumni
Royal Air Force air marshals
Companions of the Order of the Bath
Companions of the Distinguished Service Order
Recipients of the Military Cross
New Zealand military personnel of World War I
New Zealand military personnel of World War II
Chevaliers of the Légion d'honneur
New Zealand recipients of the Légion d'honneur